Clark Titus Hinman (August 3, 1819 – October 21, 1854) was the first president of Northwestern University. Hinman was born in Delaware County, New York into a Methodist family. He attended Wesleyan University, and after graduation served as an instructor at a seminary in Newbury, Vermont. In 1846, Hinman left Newbury and went to the Wesleyan seminary in Albion, Michigan (which later became Albion College, where he served as president from 1846 – 1853). While at Albion, Hinman met Erastus O. Haven (a future president of NU), and they discussed the formation of a new University. Hinman was unanimously elected president of Northwestern University by the board of trustees on August 23, 1853.

Hinman also was one of the co-founders of the Eclectic Society, originally a college fraternity at Wesleyan.  The Eclectic Society was founded in 1838, making it one of older fraternal college organizations in the United States.

References

 Northwestern University: A History, 1855-1905 By Arthur Herbert Wilde, pp. 172–189 (available in full text at Google Book Search )

1819 births
1854 deaths
People from Delaware County, New York
Wesleyan University alumni
Presidents of Northwestern University
Albion College faculty